Karpina is a rural locality (a village) in Leninskoye Rural Settlement, Kudymkarsky District, Perm Krai, Russia. The population was 39 as of 2010.

Geography 
Karpina is located 60 km southwest of Kudymkar (the district's administrative centre) by road. Polva is the nearest rural locality.

References 

Rural localities in Kudymkarsky District